The Burmese records in swimming are the fastest ever performances of swimmers from Myanmar, which are recognised and ratified by the Myanmar Swimming Federation.

All records were set in finals unless noted otherwise.

Long Course (50 m)

Men

Women

Short Course (25 m)

Men

Women

References

National records in swimming
Swimming records
Records
Swimming